Holambi Khurd is a locality in North Delhi District, Delhi, India.

References 

Geography of Delhi